Baden-Baden is a spa town in the state of Baden-Württemberg, south-western Germany, at the north-western border of the Black Forest mountain range on the small river Oos, ten kilometres (six miles) east of the Rhine, the border with France, and forty kilometres (twenty-five miles) north-east of Strasbourg, France.

In 2021, the town became part of the transnational UNESCO World Heritage Site under the name "Great Spa Towns of Europe", because of its famous spas and architecture that exemplifies the popularity of spa towns in Europe in the 18th through 20th centuries.

Name

(Modern German uses the plural form .) As with the English placename "Bath", other Badens are at hot springs throughout Central Europe. The current doubled name arose to distinguish it from the others, particularly Baden near Vienna in Austria and Baden near Zürich in Switzerland. The original Margraviate of Baden (1112-1535) split into several territories, including Baden-Baden and Baden-Durlach. The name "Baden-Baden" distinguished the  Margraviate of Baden-Baden (1535–1771), from the  Margraviate of Baden-Durlach. "Baden-Baden" thus means the town of Baden in the territory of Baden, whereas the name of the Margraviate of Baden-Baden meant "the Margraviate of Baden with its princely seat at Baden". Baden-Baden formally got its current name in 1931.

Geography
Baden-Baden lies in a valley of the Northern Black Forest in southwestern Germany. The western districts lie within the Upper Rhine Plain. The highest mountain of Baden-Baden is the Badener Höhe, which is part of the Black Forest National Park. The old town lies on the side of a hill on the right bank of the Oos. Since the 19th century, the principal resorts have been located on the other side of the river. The water is rich in salt and flows from artesian wells  under Florentine Hill at a rate of 341 litres (90 gallons) per minute and is conveyed through pipes to the town's baths.

History
Roman settlement at Baden-Baden has been dated as far back as the emperor Hadrian, but on dubious authority. The known ruins of the Roman bath were rediscovered just below the New Castle in 1847 and date to the reign of Caracalla (AD 210s), who visited the area to relieve his arthritic aches. The facilities were used by the Roman garrison in Strasbourg.

The town fell into ruin but its church was first constructed in the 7th century. By 1112, it was the seat of the Margraviate of Baden. The Lichtenthal Convent was founded in 1254. The margraves initially used Hohenbaden Castle (the Old Castle), whose ruins still occupy the summit above the town, but they completed and moved to the New Castle in 1479. The Margraviate was divided in 1535, with Baden-Baden becoming the capital of the Margraviate of Baden-Baden, while the other portion became the Margraviate of Baden-Durlach. The Baden-Baden witch trials, an investigating encompassing the entire territory and resulting in hundreds of verdicts, took place in 1627-1631.  Baden suffered severely during the Thirty Years' War, particularly at the hands of the French, who plundered it in 1643. They returned to occupy the city in 1688 at the onset of the Nine Years' War, burning it to the ground the next year. The margravine Sibylla rebuilt the New Castle in 1697, but the margrave Louis William removed his seat to Rastatt in 1706. The Stiftskirche was rebuilt in 1753 and houses the tombs of several of the margraves.

The town began its recovery in the late 18th century, serving as a refuge for émigrés from the French Revolution. The town was frequented during the Second Congress of Rastatt in 1797–99 and became popular after the visit of the Prussian queen in the early 19th century. She came for medicinal reasons, as the waters were recommended for gout, rheumatism, paralysis, neuralgia, skin disorders, and stones. The Ducal government subsequently subsidized the resort's development. The town became a meeting place for celebrities, who visited the hot springs and the town's other amenities: luxury hotels, the Spielbank Casino, horse races, and the gardens of the Lichtentaler Allee. Guests included Queen Victoria, Wilhelm I, and Berlioz. The pumproom was completed in 1842. The Grand Duchy's railway's mainline reached Baden in 1845. Reaching its zenith under Napoleon III in the 1850s and '60s, Baden became "Europe's summer capital". (French tourism fell off following the Franco-Prussian War.)

The theater was completed in 1861 and a Greek church with a gilt dome was erected on the Michaelsberg in 1863 to serve as the tomb of the teenage son of the prince of Moldavia Mihail Sturdza after he died during a family vacation. A Russian Orthodox church was also subsequently erected. The casino was closed for a time in the 1870s.

Just before the First World War, the town was receiving  visitors each year.

During the Second World War, 3.1% of the houses in Baden-Baden were completely destroyed by bombs and 125 civilians were killed. 5.8% of the houses were heavily damaged by bombs. Lichtenthal, a residential area in the southwest of the town, was hit by bombs and Saint Bonifatius Church was severely damaged on 11 March 1943. Balg, a residential area in the northeast of Baden-Baden, was hit by bombs on 17 December 1944. On 30 December 1944 one third of the buildings of Oos (i.e. about 300 houses), a residential area in the north of the town, was destroyed or heavily damaged by bombs and Saint Dionysius Church was severely damaged as well. On 2 January 1945 the railway station of Oos and various barracks on Schwarzwald Road were heavily damaged by bombs. 
After World War II, Baden-Baden became the headquarters of the French occupation forces in Germany as well as of the Südwestfunk, one of Germany's large public broadcasting stations, which is now part of Südwestrundfunk. From 23–28 September 1981, the XIth Olympic Congress took place in Baden-Baden's . The Festspielhaus Baden-Baden, Germany's largest opera and concert house, opened in 1998.

Karlsruhe/Baden-Baden Airport, or Baden Airpark is now the second-largest airport in Baden-Württemberg by number of passengers.

In 1981 Baden-Baden hosted the Olympic Congress, which later has made the town awarded the designation Olympic town.

Climate
Climate in this area has mild differences between highs and lows, and there is precipitation year round.  The Köppen Climate Classification subtype for this climate is "Cfb" (Marine West Coast Climate/Oceanic climate).

Lord Mayors

 1907–1929: Reinhard Fieser
 1929–1934: Hermann Elfner
 1934–1945: Hans Schwedhelm (when he was not in office because of military service, mayor Kurt Bürkle was in office)
 April 1945–May 1945: Ludwig Schmitt
 May 1945–January 1946: Karl Beck
 January 1946–September 1946: Eddy Schacht
 1946–1969: Ernst Schlapper (CDU) (1888-1976)
 1969–1990: Walter Carlein (CDU) (1922-2011)
 1990–1998: Ulrich Wendt (CDU)
 1998–2006: Sigrun Lang (independent)
 2006–2014: Wolfgang Gerstner (born 1955), (CDU)
 2014-2022: Margret Mergen (born 1961), (CDU)
 2022-present: Dietmar Späth (independent)

Tourism 
Baden-Baden is a German spa town. The city offers many options for sports enthusiasts; golf and tennis are both popular in the area. Horse races take place each May, August and October at nearby Iffezheim. The countryside is ideal for hiking and mountain climbing. In the winter Baden-Baden is a skiing destination. There is an 18-hole golf course in Fremersberg.

Sights include:

 The , whose  ("Spa Garden") hosts the annual Baden-Baden Summer Nights, featuring live classical music concerts
 Casino
 Friedrichsbad
 Caracalla Spa
 Lichtentaler Allee park and gardens
 Staatliche Kunsthalle Baden-Baden (State Art Gallery)
 Museum Frieder Burda built by Richard Meier for one of Germany's most extensive collections of modern art
 Fabergé Museum
 Museum der Kunst und Technik des 19. Jahrhunderts (Lichtentaler Allee 8), covering the technology of the 19th century
 Kunstmuseum Gehrke-Remund, which exhibits the work of Frida Kahlo
 , Johannes Brahms's residence, which has been preserved as a museum
 Hohenbaden Castle or Old Castle, a ruin since the 16th century
 New Castle, the former residence of the margraves and grand dukes of Baden, now a historical museum
 Festspielhaus Baden-Baden, the second-largest festival hall in Europe
 Ruins of Roman baths, excavated in 1847
 , a church including the tombs of fourteen margraves of Baden
 Paradise, an Italian-style Renaissance garden with many trick fountains
 Mount Merkur, including the Merkurbergbahn funicular railway and observation tower
 Fremersberg Tower
 Sturdza Chapel on the Michaelsberg, a neoclassical chapel with a gilded dome designed by Leo von Klenze which was erected over the tomb of prince Michel Sturdza's son

Transport

Road
The main road link is autobahn A5 between Freiburg and Frankfurt, which is 10 km away from the city.

There are two stations providing intercity bus services: one next to the main railway station and one at the airport.

Railway
Baden-Baden has three stations, Baden-Baden station being the most important of them.

Air
Karlsruhe/Baden-Baden Airport is an airport located in Baden-Baden that also serves the city of Karlsruhe. It is Baden-Württemberg's second-largest airport after Stuttgart Airport, and the 18th-largest in Germany with 1,110,500 passengers as of 2016 and mostly serves low-cost and leisure flights.

Image gallery

Twin towns – sister cities

Baden-Baden is twinned with:

 Karlovy Vary, Czech Republic
 Menton, France
 Moncalieri, Italy
 Sochi, Russia
 Yalta, Russia

Artistic depiction 
Baden featured in Tolstoy's Anna Karenina (under an alias) and Turgenev's Smoke. Dostoyevsky wrote The Gambler while compulsively gambling at the town's casino.

The novel Summer in Baden-Baden by Leonid Tsypkin is inspired in Dostoyevsky's visit to this resort.

The 1975 film The Romantic Englishwoman was filmed on location in Baden-Baden, featuring the Brenner's Park Hotel particularly prominently. The 1997 Bollywood movie Dil To Pagal Hai was also shot in the town.

Baden-Baden is the subject of a pop song by Finnish songwriter Chisu of how the economic woes of Finland could be solved by selling bottled tears to Europe (specifically Baden-Baden).

Notable people

Public service & commerce 
 Philip II, Margrave of Baden-Baden (1559–1588), Margrave of Baden-Baden, 1571 to 1588
 William, Margrave of Baden-Baden (1593–1677), regent of Baden-Baden, 1621 and 1677
 Ferdinand Maximilian of Baden-Baden (1625–1669), father of the "Türkenlouis" Louis William, Margrave of Baden-Baden
 Friedrich, Freiherr von Zoller (1762–1821), Bavarian lieutenant-general who fought in the Napoleonic Wars
 Emil Kessler (1813–1867), entrepreneur, founder of the Maschinenfabrik Esslingen
 Colonel Francis Mahler (1826–1863), officer in the Union Army during the American Civil War
 Richard Enderlin (1843-1930), Union Army, Medal of Honor recipient for rescuing a fallen comrade during the second day of the Battle of Gettysburg during the American Civil War
 William Hespeler (1830–1921), German-Canadian businessman, immigration agent and a member of the Legislative Assembly of Manitoba
 Francis Pigou (1832–1916), Anglican priest
 Sir William Des Vœux (1834–1909), British colonial governor, Governor of Fiji (1880–1885), Governor of Newfoundland (1886–1887) and Governor of Hong Kong (1887–1891)
 Prince Maximilian of Baden (1867–1929), last heir of the Grand Duchy of Baden, a German prince, general and politician
 Louis II, Prince of Monaco (1870–1949), Prince of Monaco from 1922 to 1949
 Wilhelm Brückner (1884–1954), officer and chief adjutant of Adolf Hitler
 Rudolf Höss (1900–1947), Nazi, SS commandant of Auschwitz concentration camp, executed for war crimes
 Leopold Gutterer (1902–1996), Nazi state secretary in the Reich Ministry of Public Enlightenment and Propaganda
 Felix Gilbert (1905–1991), German-American historian
 Fritz Suhren (1908–1950), SS Nazi concentration camp commandant executed for war crimes
 Kai Whittaker (born 1985), German CDU politician, member of the Bundestag since 2013

The arts 
 Anna Zerr (1822–1881), German operatic soprano
 Eugene Armbruster (1865–1943), New York City photographer, illustrator, writer, and historian
 Paul Nikolaus Cossmann (1869–1942 in Theresienstadt), German journalist
 Hermine Finck (1872–1932), opera singer
 Édouard Risler (1873–1929), French pianist
 Reinhold Schneider (1903–1958), writer
 Franz Zureich (1904–1992), painter
 Antoinette Bower (born 1932), British-American actress
 Tony Marshall (born 1938), pop and opera singer
 Heinz Bosl (1946–1975), German ballet dancer
 Elmar Hörig (born 1949), radio and television presenter
 Robert HP Platz (born 1951), composer and conductor
 Sabine von Maydell (born 1955), actress and author
 Marc Trillard (born 1955), French writer
 Andreas Heinecke (born 1955), social entrepreneur and creator of Dialogue in the Dark
 Jean-Marc Rochette (born 1956), French painter, illustrator and comics creator.
 Tobias A. Schliessler (born 1958), German cinematographer
 Ann-Marie MacDonald (born 1958), Canadian playwright, novelist, actress and broadcast host
 Stefan Anton Reck (born 1960), German orchestra conductor and painter
 Birgit Stauch (born 1961), German sculptor, works in bronzes, sculptures, sketches and portraits.
 Florian Ballhaus (born 1965), German cinematographer
 Alexandra Kamp (born 1966), German model and actress, grew up in Baden-Baden.

Science 
 Franz Carl Müller-Lyer (1857–1916), psychologist and sociologist, eponymn of the Müller-Lyer illusion
 Joseph Vollmer (1871–1955), automobile designer, engineer and pioneering tank designer
 Alfred Kühn (1885–1968), zoologist and geneticist
 Frederick Lindemann, 1st Viscount Cherwell (1886–1957), British physicist
 Erich Friedrich Schmidt (1897–1964), German and American-naturalized archaeologist
 Wolfgang Krull (1899–1971), mathematician

Sport 
 Marco Grimm (born 1972), football player, 334 pro appearances
 Frank Moser (born 1976), German professional tennis player
 Magdalena Schnurr (born 1992), German ski jumper

See also 
 List of reduplicated place names

References

Bibliography
 
 
 .

Further reading

External links 

  

 
Karlsruhe (region)
Towns in Baden-Württemberg
Baden
Spa towns in Germany
Gambling in Germany
Burial sites of the House of Leiningen